In Greek mythology, Eurylochus (Ancient Greek: Εὐρύλοχος Eurúlokhos) appears in Homer's Odyssey as second-in-command of Odysseus' ship during the return to Ithaca after the Trojan War. He is portrayed as an unpleasant, cowardly individual who undermines Odysseus and stirs up trouble.

Family 
Eurylochus was the husband of Odysseus's sister, Ctimene.

Mythology 
When Odysseus and 12 of his crew, including Eurylochus, came into the port of Sicily, the Cyclops Polyphemus seized and confined them. Along with the Ithacan king and six others namely: Lycaon, Amphialos, Alkimos, Amphidamas and Antilochus, Eurylochus survived the manslaughter of his six companions by the monster.

When the ship stops on Aeaea, home of Circe the goddess-sorceress, daughter of the sun god Helios and the Oceanid nymph Perse, Eurylochus and Odysseus draw lots to lead a group of twenty-two men to explore the island. Eurylochus is chosen. After the crew spots a column of smoke, Eurylochus leads his expedition towards the source. They near a palace surrounded with wild but magically benign animals. Inside the palace is Circe singing, and (led by Polites) all rush in, except for Eurylochus who suspects her treachery. When she turns the rest of the expedition into pigs, Eurylochus escapes and warns Odysseus and the portion of the crew who stayed on the ship, thus enabling Odysseus to attempt a rescue. When Odysseus goes to save his men, Eurylochus refuses to guide him and urges him to escape and leave the men to their fate.

When Odysseus returns from Circe, having rescued the men, Eurylochus insults Odysseus. Odysseus considers killing him but the crewmen drag them apart. After their reconciliation, Circe advises Odysseus to see the prophet Tiresias for advice to get back home. Tiresias instructs Odysseus not to touch the cattle of Helios, but Eurylochus persuades the hungry and mutinous crew to kill and eat some of the god's cattle. As punishment, Odysseus' ship is destroyed, and all of his crew, including Eurylochus, are killed in a storm sent by Zeus. Only Odysseus survives.

Notes

References 

 Apollodorus, The Library with an English Translation by Sir James George Frazer, F.B.A., F.R.S. in 2 Volumes, Cambridge, MA, Harvard University Press; London, William Heinemann Ltd. 1921. ISBN 0-674-99135-4. Online version at the Perseus Digital Library. Greek text available from the same website.
Homer, The Odyssey with an English Translation by A.T. Murray, PH.D. in two volumes. Cambridge, MA., Harvard University Press; London, William Heinemann, Ltd. 1919. . Online version at the Perseus Digital Library. Greek text available from the same website.
Pausanias, Description of Greece with an English Translation by W.H.S. Jones, Litt.D., and H.A. Ormerod, M.A., in 4 Volumes. Cambridge, MA, Harvard University Press; London, William Heinemann Ltd. 1918. . Online version at the Perseus Digital Library
Pausanias, Graeciae Descriptio. 3 vols. Leipzig, Teubner. 1903.  Greek text available at the Perseus Digital Library.
Tzetzes, John, Allegories of the Odyssey translated by Goldwyn, Adam J. and Kokkini, Dimitra. Dumbarton Oaks Medieval Library, Harvard University Press, 2015. 

Achaeans (Homer)
Characters in the Odyssey